Mao Sareth was a Cambodian singer active from the early 1960s to the mid-1970s. Sareth was born in 1944 in Battambang, with the birth name Pol Sarann. She was one of the earliest popular singers in the Cambodian rock scene of the early 1960s, in which musicians combined traditional Khmer music styles with popular forms from the United States, Europe, and Latin America. Mao was cited as an influence by later singers Pen Ran and Ros Serey Sothea. She is known to have performed live as late as 1973.

During an interview with Huoy Meas, Mao Sareth stated that she had three sisters and that she came from a family of musicians. In her free time she liked to read romantic novels. Along with many musicians and members of other suspect professions, she was executed by the Khmer Rouge sometime during the later years of the Cambodian Civil War or early in the Cambodian Genocide.

References

1944 births
20th-century Cambodian women singers
Year of death missing
People executed by the Khmer Rouge
Executed Cambodian women